Lysinibacillus alkaliphilus is a Gram-positive, aerobic, extremely alkaliphilic and endospore-forming bacterium from the genus of Lysinibacillus.

References

Bacillaceae
Bacteria described in 2015